Taufeeq Umar (Punjabi: توفیق عمر, born 20 June 1981) is a Pakistani former cricketer who played for the Pakistan national cricket team between 2001 and 2014. Umar was a regular Test opening batsman for three seasons, before being dropped ahead of the 2004–05 season. On 23 May 2020, he tested positive for COVID-19 and he insisted that he didn't develop cautious symptoms. He recovered successfully from the coronavirus in June 2020.

International career
Unusually for a Pakistani player, Umar has played more Tests than ODIs, as he was not given a prolonged run in the ODI side until 2003, when he played eight ODIs in a row. However, he only missed two of 24 Tests played between August 2001 and April 2004, and after 17 Tests his batting average had reached 48.03 after he made four scores above 50 in the two-Test series with South Africa.

Possessing excellent temperament, he remains unique amongst Pakistani openers in his ability to concentrate for long periods and his ability to build innings. With exquisite drives either side of the wicket, a formidable cut and pull shot in the armoury and possessing the natural gift of timing, he seemed the very answer to Pakistan's opening problem especially against a full strength South African attack in South Africa (2003). A loss of form against India (2004) resulted in Taufeeq losing his place in the team and a subsequent loss of batting confidence.

He was recalled into the Pakistani side for the South Africa Series in 2010. He made his comeback against South Africa with some good scores. Against West Indies, he scored a century and then a brilliant double hundred against Sri Lanka at UAE. He has again become a regular part of Test squad as an opener. he continued to play for Pakistan until Sri Lanka in 2012. After the series, he was dropped from the squad, until his later comeback for a single test match in 2014 against New Zealand. He scored only 16 and 4 in the two innings and was dropped from the squad.

Domestic career
He continued to be in the Pakistani selectors' minds, playing for Pakistan against a touring England XI in 2005–06, and continued to play for Lahore Ravi and Habib Bank Limited in Pakistani domestic competitions. It remains to be seen whether he can recover his solid technique and return to Test cricket as the formidable opener he was meant to be.

This is compounded by the fact that he joined the rebel Indian Cricket League and represented the Lahore Badshahs. Taufeeq spent a summer in the UK playing Professional League cricket for Lancaster Cricket Club in the Northern League.

References

External links

1981 births
Living people
Habib Bank Limited cricketers
Lahore cricketers
Pakistan One Day International cricketers
Pakistan Test cricketers
Cricketers who made a century on Test debut
ICL Pakistan XI cricketers
Mumbai Champs cricketers
Delhi Giants cricketers
Pakistani cricketers
Lahore Whites cricketers
Lahore City cricketers
Sui Northern Gas Pipelines Limited cricketers
Baluchistan Bears cricketers
Lahore Eagles cricketers
Punjab (Pakistan) cricketers
Cricketers from Lahore
Cricketers at the 2003 Cricket World Cup
Central Model School, Lahore alumni
People from Lahore